Operation Z may refer to:

 Attack on Pearl Harbor, known as Operation Z in planning
 Operation Z (1944), Japanese World War II plan for the defense of the Marianas Islands
 2022 Russian invasion of Ukraine, using Z as a military symbol, and thus sometimes referred to as "Operation Z"

See also
Plan Z
Project Z (disambiguation)
Operation Zet